European civilisation may refer to:

Culture of Europe
Western culture, European cultural area around the world